Fazli Ayob (born 24 January 1990) is a Singaporean footballer who plays as a midfielder for Home United FC in the S.League.

Career statistics

Club

Notes

Honours

International
Singapore
AFF Championship: 2012

References

External links 
 

Living people
1990 births
Singaporean footballers
Singapore international footballers
LionsXII players
Singapore Premier League players
Association football midfielders
Home United FC players
Malaysia Super League players
Young Lions FC players
Southeast Asian Games bronze medalists for Singapore
Southeast Asian Games medalists in football
Competitors at the 2009 Southeast Asian Games